The Nikon D3400 is a 24.2-megapixel DX format DSLR Nikon F-mount camera officially launched by Nikon on August 17, 2016. It is marketed as an entry-level DSLR camera for beginners and experienced DSLR hobbyists. It replaces the D3300 as Nikon's entry level DSLR.

Nikon offers a body/lens kit combinations that varies from country to country. In most countries the D3400 is available with an AF-P 18-55 mm kit lens that includes Nikon's image stabilization  (Vibration Reduction, VR). In the US there is an unusual two lens kit option offered only with the black body. The 18–55 mm lens has VR but the second lens being a 70–300 mm is the non-VR variant for a total of US$999.

The D3400 is available in a black or red body.

The D3400 was superseded as Nikon's entry-level camera by the D3500 in August 2018.

Changes from D3300

 Added Nikon Snapbridge support via Bluetooth Low Energy, replaced Wi-Fi (note remote control not supported) (GPS geo-tagging added)
 Increased maximum ISO to 25600
 Weaker flash
 Longer battery life
 Infrared receiver repositioned
 Removed 3.5 mm microphone port
 Removed composite video output
 Removed ultrasonic sensor cleaner
 Removed effects Color Sketch, HDR Painting and Easy Panorama
 Removed intervalometer port MC-DC2
  lighter

References

External links

Nikon D3400, Nikon USA
Changes from D3300

D3400
D3400
Cameras introduced in 2016